Bondojito is a metro station along Line 4 of the Mexico City Metro. It is located in the Gustavo A. Madero borough of Mexico City.

General information
The station logo depicts a cactus, and its name refers to the Otomí word of Bondo, that means, in fact, cactus. In the zone where station stands existed big plantations of cactus (locally known as nopales).

This station transfers to "G" trolleybus line, which runs between Metro El Rosario and Metro Boulevard Puerto Aéreo.

Bondojito serves the Colonia Bondojito and Colonia Tablas de San Agustín neighborhoods. It stands over Avenida Congreso de la Unión.

From 23 April to 14 June 2020, the station was temporarily closed due to the COVID-19 pandemic in Mexico.

Ridership

Exits
West: Avenida Congreso de la Unión and Oriente 101 street, Colonia Bondojito
East: Avenida Congreso de la Unión and Oriente 103 street, Colonia Tablas de San Agustín

References

External links 

Bondojito
Railway stations opened in 1981
1981 establishments in Mexico
Mexico City Metro stations in Gustavo A. Madero, Mexico City